"The Ship That Never Returned" is an 1865 song written by Henry Clay Work, about a ship that left a harbor and never came back. A reason for the ship not returning is not given in the lyrics. However, the line "and their fate is yet unlearned" implies that the reason is unknown.

The song became so popular that Carl Sandburg's collection American Songbag recorded an adaptation from the Kentucky mountains. The tune formed the basis of "Wreck of the Old 97", about a 1903 train wreck; recorded by Vernon Dalhart in 1924, and many others afterward, the song became the first million-selling country music hit.

Later, the melody was adapted in "Charlie on the MTA", created in 1948, as a campaign song for Walter A. O'Brien about a man unable to alight from a Boston subway train because, rather than change all the turnstiles, the M.T.A. added an exit fare—Charlie did not have the extra nickel to get off the train.  The Kingston Trio recorded the song in 1959 (as "M.T.A.") and had a hit with the recording in the same year.

External links 
Lyrics and sheet music

Maritime music
Songs about boats
American folk songs
1865 songs
Songs written by Henry Clay Work